Georgios Gogos (born 11 July 2001) is a Greek professional footballer who plays as a centre-back for Super League 2 club Thesprotos.

Career

PAS Giannina
In February 2018, Gogos signed his first professional contract with PAS Giannina. He made his debut in an away 6–1 win against Apollon Pontou. His contract didn't renewed and he was set free.

Honours 
PAS Giannina

 Super League Greece 2: 2019–20

References

2001 births
Living people
Greek footballers
Greece youth international footballers
Super League Greece 2 players
PAS Giannina F.C. players
Association football defenders
Footballers from Ioannina